= Tuskegee Republican =

Former newspaper from Alabama, USA

The Tuskegee Republican was a newspaper published in Tuskegee, Alabama. It was a Whig affiliated newspaper originally by Daniel Sayre and J. L. Caldwell from 1845 to 1859. Daniel Sayre Jr. took over the paper that year but was killed early in the American Civil War. It competed with The Democrat for readership in Tuskegee.

In 1854 it denounced Frederick Douglass addressing students at a university in Ohio. It had a reputation for being anti-Jewish.
